Ratul Khan (born 30 June 2001) is a Bangladeshi cricketer. He made his Twenty20 debut for Bangladesh Krira Shikkha Protishtan in the 2018–19 Dhaka Premier Division Twenty20 Cricket League on 25 February 2019. He made his List A debut for Bangladesh Krira Shikkha Protishtan in the 2018–19 Dhaka Premier Division Cricket League on 8 March 2019.

References

External links
 

2001 births
Living people
Bangladeshi cricketers
Bangladesh Krira Shikkha Protishtan cricketers
Place of birth missing (living people)